Bhavesh Patel may refer to:

Bhavesh Patel (cricketer) (born 1985), English cricketer
Bhavesh Patel (actor) (born 1980), American actor and writer